Noreen Ford Dilcock (born 28 March 1907 in Kingston upon Hull, England - d. 1985 in Walsall, England, United Kingdom) was a British writer of romance novels from 1952 to 1977 under different pseudonyms: Norrey Ford, Jill Christian and Christian Walford.

She was the second elected Chairman (1963–1965) of the Romantic Novelists' Association and also was a former vice-president of the organization. She was the Walsall Writers' Circle founder and life president.

Biography
Noreen "Norrey" Ford born on 28 March 1907 in Kingston upon Hull, England, UK. Her parents were Robert Ford and Esther Richardson. She studied at Hull's French Convent, Ravensworth School and Appleton-le-Moors. She married James Louis Christian Dilcock (1911–2000), a Midland judge and lay preacher at Walsall's St Paul's Church. The marriage spent much time travelling the world. Norren died on 1985 in Walsall, and her ashes were scattered over the fells by the Lake District.

Bibliography

As Norrey Ford

Magazine article
Teas provided, Housewife magazine (1946)

Single novels
Where Love Is (1952)
Romantic Heart (1953)
My Gentle Enemy (1953)
Dragon Castle (1954)
The Mistress of High Trees (1955)
The Rainbow in the Spray (1956)
Nurse with a Dream (1957)
Let Love Abide (1957)
Wild Waters (1958)
The House of My Enemy (1959)
The Far Sweet Thing (1960)
Wild Rowan (1961)
Doctor in the Dale (1966)
Rich Man, Poor Man (1968)
Marriage Tree (1969)
Someone Different (1970)
Trouble at Gilmore's (1972)
Call to the Castle (1974)
One Hot Summer (1974)
Walk Tall Country (1974)
Life Most Dear (1974)
Road of the Eagles (1975)
The Love Goddess (1976)
Fountain of Love (1977)

As Jill Christian

Single novels
Bid Me to Love (1952)
Heart in Waiting (1953)
Love in the Morning (1954)
Darling Girl (1954)
Beyond the Frost the Flower (1955)
Harvest of the Heart (1955)
The Chosen One (1956)
Summer Shadow (1958)
This Day and For Ever (1959)
Lad's Love (1960)
The Tender Bond (1961)
The Long Summer Night (1962)
Nurse of My Heart (1963)
The Castle of the Ravens (1967)
Master of This House (1970)
A Scent of Lemons (1972)

Anthologies in collaboration
Return to Love / Stormy Haven / Nurse to Captain Andy (1972) (with Rosalind Brett and Alex Stuart)
Tell Me My Fortune / A Scent Of Lemons / Country Of The Wine (1979) (with Mary Burchell and Mary Wibberley)

As Christian Walford

Single novels
The Little Masters (1969)

References and sources

                   

English romantic fiction writers
1907 births
1985 deaths
Place of death missing
20th-century English novelists